Dwayne Allen Abernathy Jr. (born July 17, 1976), better known by his stage name Dem Jointz, is an American record producer. He has produced tracks for numerous artists including Rihanna, Anderson .Paak, and NCT, among others. He also co-produced four tracks on Compton (2015), the third and latest studio album by Dr. Dre, as well as several tracks on Janet Jackson's Billboard 200 number 1 album Unbreakable (2015). Abernathy has also worked extensively on the album Donda (2021) by Kanye West, providing production work or additional vocals on songs such as "Jail".

His vision extends into his own label "U Made Us What We Are," which he founded to elevate talented creatives, including Maryland MC K.A.A.N. and gospel singer Keedron Bryant.

Personal life 
On November 6, 2021, Dem Jointz announced on Instagram that he's engaged to his partner, Stalone, a Grammy-winning vocalist.

Producer tag 
Dem Jointz's can be recognized by his "Incoming!" producer tag in the beginning on the songs he produced, for example in Kanye West's Nah Nah Nah during the first three seconds of the song. He also uses the tag "Now, the breakdown" before the bridge of many songs, including Taeyeon's Something New and Lee Chaeyeon's Hush Rush.

Discography

References

External links 
 Dem Jointz credits on AllMusic

Living people
American male musicians
Record producers from California
Songwriters from California
Musicians from Compton, California
1976 births
American male songwriters